The Eurobridges Spijkenisse, locally known as the Spijkenisser Eurobruggen, is an applied arts project in the city of Spijkenisse, in the Dutch province of South Holland. The project was realized in the residential area Het Land.

The bridges were designed to represent the images on the backside of euro banknotes. The bridges of the 10 and 50 euro banknotes were opened on 26 October 2011 by the then Queen's commissioner of South Holland Jan Franssen. The 5 and 20 banknotes were placed after with only one side representing the banknotes. The 200 eurobridge would be placed on 17 October 2012. On 26 September 2013, the final eurobridges were placed representing the 100 and 500 banknotes.

The bridges were designed by Robin Stam. They are made from a concrete base with coloured concrete panels placed on the sides.

References

Bridges in South Holland
Nissewaard
Decorative arts
Euro